Roger Mills may refer to:

 Roger H. Mills (1813–1881), American politician and lawyer in Connecticut
 Roger Q. Mills (1832–1911), U.S. Representative and Senator from Texas
 Roger Mills County, Oklahoma, named in his honor
 Roger Mills (badminton) (born 1942), English badminton player
 Roger Mills (racewalker) (born 1948), British race walker
 Roger Mills (speedway rider) (born c. 1950), British speedway rider
 Roger W. Mills (born 1951), British economist

Mills, Roger